Sundance Air Venezuela S.A. is a cargo and private charter airline based in Porlamar, Venezuela. It is a start-up airline with services within Venezuela and to the Caribbean.

Destinations

Barcelona (General José Antonio Anzoátegui International Airport) Charter
Coche Island (Andrés Miguel Salazar Marcano Airport) Charter
Porlamar (Santiago Mariño Caribbean International Airport) Hub
Canaima (Canaima Airport) Charter

Fleet

Current fleet
Sundance Air Venezuela includes the following aircraft:

Former fleet
2 Let L-410 Turbolet

See also
List of airlines of Venezuela

References

External links

Official website

Airlines of Venezuela
Airlines established in 2002
Venezuelan companies established in 2002